Popayanita is a genus of moths belonging to the family Tortricidae.

Species
Popayanita ptycta Razowski, 1987

See also
List of Tortricidae genera

References

 , 2005, World Catalogue of Insects 5

External links
tortricidae.com

Euliini
Tortricidae genera